Leigh Capsalis (born 23 December 1971) is a former Australian rules footballer who played for St Kilda in the Australian Football League (AFL) in 1993. He was recruited from the Keysborough Football Club in the Mornington Peninsula Nepean Football League (MPNFL) with the 69th selection in the 1993 Preseason Draft.

References

External links

Living people
1971 births
St Kilda Football Club players
Australian rules footballers from Victoria (Australia)